Samuel Carmona Heredia (born 28 May 1996) is a Spanish professional boxer. As an amateur, he competed in the light flyweight event at the 2016 Summer Olympics, and was eliminated in the quarterfinal.

Amateur boxing career
He began his career in 2008. In 2013, was runner-up in the Young Amateur Championship of Spain, 52 kg, defeating José María González for 19: 6 in the semifinal and fell in the final 10: 6 against Grabriel Escobar. In 2014, he again fell against Escobar, this time in the semifinals by 2: 1, and beat Ivan Chaves in the fight for third place. 
That same year, he won the Tournament of Spain in the category of less than 49 kg, when he defeated Gustavo de la Nuez in the final.

In 2015, he won the Spanish championship, winning the final against Brandon Moreno Núñez, receiving a call from Rafael Lozano to will become part of the selection española. On 4 June at the 2015 European Championships held in Samokov (Bulgaria), he finished in 5th place, which qualified for the 2015 World Championship Amateur Boxing in Doha.

He qualified for the 2016 Summer Olympics in the world Olympic qualifiers in Baku, to qualify for the final defeating in the semifinal Indian pugilist Devendro Singh by 3 to 0.8 before (April), he had lost in the battle for third and since giving place for the Games in the Olympic Qualifying European Championship in Samsun (Turkey).

Professional boxing career
Carmona made his professional debut against Alejandro Torres on 14 September 2019, and won the fight by a second-round knockout. Carmona was next scheduled to face Franklin Flores on 19 October 2019. He won the fight by a second-round knockout. Following this victory, Carmona signed with the Russia-based promoter Patriot Boxing Promotions. Accordingly, his next fight against Enrique Magsalin took place in Russia, on 21 December 2019. He won it by unanimous decision, with scores of 79–73, 79-73 and 78–74.

Carmona was scheduled to fight Jose Antonio Jimenez for the vacant WBA International flyweight title on 1 February 2020. He won his sole fight of the year by first-round knockout, stopping Jimenez after just 93 seconds.

Carmona was scheduled to face Joel Sanchez on 18 July 2021, after a 15-month hiatus from the sport. He won the fight by unanimous decision, with scores of 60–54, 60-54 and 60–53. Carmona faced Luis Fernando Villa, in his last fight of the year, on 3 December 2021. He won the fight by a first-round technical knockout. Carmona was booked to face Joel Cordova on 1 April 2022, on the undercard of the Sandor Martin and Jose Felix super lightweight bout. He won the fight by unanimous decision, with scores of 96–94, 96–93 and 97–93.

Carmona is scheduled to challenge the WBC flyweight champion Julio Cesar Martinez on 3 December 2022, at the  Desert Diamond Arena in Glendale, Arizona. He stepped in as a replacement for McWilliams Arroyo, who withdrew from the bout with a neck injury, on a month's notice. He lost the fight by majority decision, with scores of 118–111, 117–112 and 114–114.

Professional boxing record

Notes

References

External links

 
 
 
 
 

1996 births
Living people
Spanish male boxers
Olympic boxers of Spain
Boxers at the 2016 Summer Olympics
Sportspeople from Las Palmas
Light-flyweight boxers
Flyweight boxers